Gokujo may refer to:
Gokujō Parodius! ～Kako no Eikō o Motomete～, 1994 video game
Gokujo Seitokai, 26 episode anime series from 2005
Gokujyo, 12 episode anime series from 2012